Hot R&B/Hip-Hop Songs is a chart published by Billboard that ranks the top-performing songs in the United States in African-American-oriented musical genres; the chart has undergone various name changes since its launch in 1942 to reflect the evolution of such genres.  In 1972, it was published under the title Best Selling Soul Singles.  During that year, 21 different singles topped the chart, based on playlists submitted by radio stations and surveys of retail sales outlets.

In the issue of Billboard dated January 1, Sly and the Family Stone were at number one with "Family Affair", the song's fifth week in the top spot.  The following week, it was displaced by Al Green's "Let's Stay Together", which went on to spend nine weeks at number one, making it the longest-running chart-topper of the year and the song with the longest uninterrupted run atop the chart since 1965.  "Let's Stay Together" was the first number one for Green, and he would achieve two more soul chart-toppers by the end of the year, spending two weeks atop the chart in August with "I'm Still in Love with You" and one in December with "You Ought to Be with Me".  Green was one of only two acts with more than one chart-topping single during the year, and his total of 12 weeks at number one was more than twice that achieved by any other act.

As well as Al Green, several other acts topped the chart for the first time in 1972.  Beginning in the issue of Billboard dated July 8, Luther Ingram spent four weeks in the top spot with his first number one, "(If Loving You Is Wrong) I Don't Want to Be Right".  Although it was a multi-million seller, it would prove to be his only chart-topping single.  It was replaced at number one by "Where Is the Love" by Roberta Flack and Donny Hathaway, which was the first R&B number one for both singers.  Flack's previous single, "The First Time Ever I Saw Your Face", topped the all-genre Hot 100 chart for six weeks and was the year's biggest-selling single, but on the soul chart it only climbed as high as number 4.  The Dramatics, the Staple Singers, Bobby Womack, Bill Withers, Billy Preston, the O'Jays, the Spinners, Harold Melvin & the Blue Notes and Billy Paul also gained the first number ones of their respective careers in 1972.  Paul's "Me and Mrs. Jones" was the year's final number one, reaching the top spot in the issue of Billboard dated December 9 and staying there for the remainder of the year.  It was one of six of 1972's soul number ones to also top the Hot 100, along with Sly and the Family Stone's "Family Affair", Al Green's "Let's Stay Together", "I'll Take You There" by the Staple Singers, "Oh Girl" by the Chi-Lites and "Lean on Me" by Bill Withers.

Chart history

See also
 List of Billboard Hot 100 number-one singles of 1972

References

1972
1972 record charts
1972 in American music